Chrysozephyrus kabrua, the Kabru hairstreak, is a small butterfly found in India that belongs to the lycaenids or blues family.

Taxonomy
The butterfly was previously classified as Thecla kabrua Tytler.

Subspecies
Chrysozephyrus kabrua niitakanus (Kano, 1928) Taiwan 
Chrysozephyrus kabrua neidhoeferi Shimonoya & Murayama, 1971 Taiwan
Chrysozephyrus kabrua philipi Eliot, 1987 northern Thailand
Chrysozephyrus kabrua ueharai Koiwaya & Osada, 1998 Laos
Chrysozephyrus kabrua konga Yoshino, 1999 Sichuan
Chrysozephyrus kabrua aungseini Koiwaya, 2000 Myanmar
Chrysozephyrus kabrua naokoae Morita, 2002 northern Vietnam

India range
The butterfly occurs in India from Nagaland to Manipur.

See also
List of butterflies of India (Lycaenidae)

Cited references

References

  
 
 

kabrua
Butterflies of Asia